Harvey Goodwyn Fields Sr. (May 31, 1882 – May 5, 1961) was an American lawyer and Democratic politician from Farmerville, Louisiana, who was affiliated with the Long political faction, and served in the Louisiana State Senate from 1916–1920.

He had a son, T. T. Fields, served in the Louisiana House of Representatives. A grandson, Thomas T. Fields, penned a 2009 biography of Fields, I Called Him Grand Dad. Fields died in 1961.

References

1882 births
1961 deaths
People from Marksville, Louisiana
People from Farmerville, Louisiana
Louisiana Tech University alumni
Educators from Louisiana
Louisiana lawyers
Democratic Party Louisiana state senators
Members of the Louisiana Public Service Commission
United States Attorneys for the Western District of Louisiana
Burials in Louisiana
20th-century American politicians
20th-century American lawyers